The Popular Civic List (CPL) was a centrist coalition of political parties in Italy. Its leader is Beatrice Lorenzin, minister of Health from 2013 to 2018 and member of Popular Alternative.

History
CPL participated in the 2018 general election within the centre-left coalition centred on the Democratic Party (PD), along with Together (notably including the Italian Socialist Party) and the liberal More Europe.

The CPL coalition's symbol consisted in a stylised peony, Lorenzin's name and the logos of Italy of Values, the Centrists for Europe (CpE), the Union for Trentino, Italy is Popular and Popular Alternative (AP). The coalition also included Solidary Democracy, Popular Italy and the Christian Popular Union, although their logos did not appear in the coalition's symbol.

In the event, the list obtained a mere 0.5% of the vote, but three of its candidates were elected in single-seat constituencies: Lorenzin and Gabriele Toccafondi (both members of AP) to the Chamber and Pier Ferdinando Casini (CpE) to the Senate.

In September 2019 Lorenzin directlty joined the PD, while Toccafondi joined Matteo Renzi's new Italia Viva party.

Composition

Main members

Other members

Election results

Italian Parliament

References

External links

2017 establishments in Italy
Defunct political party alliances in Italy
Political parties established in 2017
Political parties with year of disestablishment missing